is a Japanese mathematician who was awarded the Fields Medal in 1970 for his contributions to algebraic geometry.

Career
Hironaka entered Kyoto University in 1949. After completing his undergraduate studies at Kyoto University, he received his Ph.D. in 1960 from Harvard University while under the direction of Oscar Zariski.

Hironaka held teaching positions at Brandeis University from 1960-1963, Columbia University in 1964, and Kyoto University from 1975 to 1988. He was a professor of mathematics at Harvard University from 1968 until becoming emeritus in 1992 and was a president of Yamaguchi University from 1996 to 2002.

Research
In 1964, Hironaka proved that singularities of algebraic varieties admit resolutions in characteristic zero. This means that any algebraic variety can be replaced by (more precisely is birationally equivalent to) a similar variety which has no singularities. He also introduced Hironaka's example showing that a deformation of Kähler manifolds need not be Kähler. In 2017 he posted to his personal webpage a manuscript that claims to prove the existence of a resolution of singularities in positive characteristic.

Awards
Hironaka was awarded the Fields Medal in 1970.

Personal life
Hironaka has been active in raising funds for causes such as mathematical education. His wife Wakako Hironaka is a politician. His daughter, Eriko Hironaka, is also a mathematician and focuses on low-dimensional topology and geometric topology.

List of books available in English 
 Formal functions and formal imbeddings / by Heisuke Hironaka and Hideyuki Matsumura (1967)
 Introduction to the theory of infinitely near singular points / Heisuke Hironaka (1974)
 The theory of the maximal contact / José M. Aroca, Heisuke Hironaka and José L. Vicente (1975)
 Desingularization theorems / Jose M. Aroca, Heisuke Hironaka and Jose L. Vicente (1977)
 Geometric singularity theory / editors of the volume, Heisuke Hironaka, Stanisław Janeczko (2004)

See also

Hironaka decomposition
Hironaka's criterion
René Thom

References

External links 
 
 
 Jackson, Allyn; Interview with Heisuke Hironaka; Notices of the American Mathematical Society; vol. 52, no. 9 (October 2005).

1931 births
20th-century Japanese mathematicians
21st-century Japanese mathematicians
Algebraic geometers
Fields Medalists
Harvard University alumni
Harvard University faculty
Brandeis University faculty
Columbia University faculty
Kyoto University alumni
Academic staff of Kyoto University
Institute for Advanced Study visiting scholars
Living people
Members of the French Academy of Sciences
Foreign Members of the Russian Academy of Sciences
Spouses of Japanese politicians
Recipients of the Order of Culture
Chevaliers of the Légion d'honneur
People from Iwakuni, Yamaguchi